The Manuscript is the third extended play (EP) by American rapper Vic Mensa. It was released on June 8, 2017, by Roc Nation and Capitol Records. The EP features guest appearances from Mr. Hudson and Pusha T. All songs excluding "Almost There" featuring Mr Hudson were later included in The Autobiography, released subsequently shortly after The Manuscript on July 28, 2017.

Track listing
Credits adapted from Tidal.

Notes
  signifies a co-producer.
  signifies an additional producer.
  "Almost There" contains elements from "These are the Words" performed by Pastor T.L. Barrett.

Charts

References

2017 EPs
Vic Mensa albums
Albums produced by No I.D.
Albums produced by Pharrell Williams
Albums produced by Mike Dean (record producer)
Roc Nation albums
Capitol Records EPs